The Prairie Aviation Museum is an aviation museum located at in Bloomington, Illinois.

History 
In 1982, a group of aviation enthusiasts led by Norm Wingler established the Gooney Bird Chapter of the Heritage in Flight Museum with the goal of acquiring and restoring a Douglas DC-3. However, due to legal and financial concerns the chapter decided to form the independent Prairie Aviation Museum in 1983. The following year, the museum purchased a Douglas C-53 Skytrooper at an auction in Rockdale, Texas and flew it back to Indiana. To complement the new acquisition, construction began on a  building in 1988.

The museum opened a new exhibit featuring oral history interviews with World War II veterans in 1995.

The museum's C-53 was added to the National Register of Historic Places in 1996. The historic designation was intended to help the museum qualify for funds that could be used to construct a new building.

The museum opened a Challenger Learning Center in the former airport terminal in 2003, but was forced to transfer operations to the Heartland Community College due to a financial shortfall. Further complications ensued and in 2009 the museum was forced to sell its DC-3, as it could no longer afford to maintain it in airworthy condition. The museum again began developing a focus on space in 2010 and as part of this effort renovated the building in 2015.

Exhibits 
Exhibits at the museum include an airport beacon and a Link Trainer.

Collection 

 Bell AH-1J SeaCobra 157771
 Bell UH-1H Iroquois 67-17832
 Cessna 310
 Grumman F-14D Tomcat 161163
 Lockheed T-33 35979
 LTV A-7A Corsair II 152681
 McDonnell Douglas A-4M Skyhawk 160036
 McDonnell Douglas F-4N Phantom II 150444
 North American F-100 Super Sabre
 Northrop T-38A Talon 60-0549

References

Notes

Bibliography

External links 
 

Aerospace museums in Illinois
Museums in McLean County, Illinois